The Transcendental Temptation: A Critique of Religion and the Paranormal is a 1986 book by the philosopher Paul Kurtz. The book was published by Prometheus Books, a company founded by Kurtz in 1969.

Summary

Kurtz analyzes the bases of religion: how provable are the claims of the famous prophets who founded religion in their name: Jesus, Moses, Muhammad, Joseph Smith, Ellen G. White and others? He asks what the prospects are for developing a humanistic society based on scientific and humane foundations.

Reception
In the award of the Norton Medal (endowed by Charles Phelps Norton) to Kurtz in 2001, The Transcendental Temptation was noted, amongst Kurtz's other contributions to secular humanism, as a seminal work on the topic. The award also noted Kurtz's founding of the Center for Inquiry.

1986 non-fiction books
American non-fiction books
Books critical of religion
English-language books
Humanism
Nontheism publications
Prometheus Books books
Secularism